The Prix Ringuet is a Canadian literary award, presented each year by the Académie des lettres du Québec to an author from Quebec for a book of French-language fiction.  First presented in 1983 as the Prix Molson, the award was later renamed for novelist Philippe Panneton, who wrote under the pen name Ringuet and was a founding member of the Académie.

Prize recipients

Prix Molson
1983 - Jacques Folch-Ribas, Le Valet de plume
1984 - Madeleine Ouellette-Michalska, La Maison Trestler
1985 - Pauline Harvey, Encore une partie pour Berri
1986 - Daniel Gagnon, La Fille à marier
1987 - Sylvain Trudel, Le Souffle de l'harmattan
1988 - Francine D'Amour, Les Dimanches sont mortels
1989 - Jean Marcel, Hypathie ou la Fin des dieux
1990 - Jacques Poulin, Le Vieux chagrin
1991 - Robert Baillie, La Nuit de la Saint-Basile
1992 - Paul Bussières, Mais qui va donc consoler Mingo?
1993 - Jacques Desautels, Le Quatrième roi mage
1994 - Sergio Kokis, Le Pavillon des miroirs

Prix Ringuet
1997 - Louise Dupré, La Memoria
1998 - Pierre Ouellet, La légende dorée
1999 - Gaétan Soucy, La petite fille qui aimait trop les allumettes
2000 - Christiane Duchesne, L'homme des silences
2001 - Aki Shimazaki, Hamaguri
2002 - Guillaume Vigneault, Chercher le vent
2003 - Rober Racine, L'ombre de la terre
2004 - Gilles Jobidon,  La route des petits matins
2005 - Pierre Yergeau, Les amours perdues
2006 - Martine Desjardins, L'évocation
2007 - Andrée A. Michaud, Mirror Lake
2008 - Hélène Rioux, Mercredi Soir au Bout du Monde
2009 - Martin Robitaille, Les déliaisons
2010 - Alexandre Lazaridès, Adieu, vert paradis
2011 - Louis Hamelin, La Constellation du lynx
2012 - Jocelyne Saucier, Il pleuvait des oiseaux
2013 - Jean Bédard, Marguerite Porète
2014 - Yvon Paré, Le voyage d'Ulysse
2015 - Michaël La Chance, Épisodies
2016 - Gabriel Marcoux-Chabot, Tas-droches
2017 - Christian Guay-Poliquin, Le Poids de la neige
2018 - Stéfanie Clermont, Le jeu de la musique
2019 - Kevin Lambert, Querelle de Roberval
2020 - Élise Turcotte, L’apparition du chevreuil

References

French-language literature in Canada
Canadian fiction awards
Quebec awards
French-language literary awards
Awards established in 1983
1983 establishments in Canada